Tom Miller may refer to:

Tom Miller (saloon keeper), who built a saloon in Deadwood, South Dakota in 1876
Tom Miller (catcher) (1850–1876), American baseball player
Tom Miller (footballer, born 1890) (1890–1958), Scottish footballer and top league scorer for Liverpool F.C. in 1914
Tom Miller (pinch hitter) (1897–1980), American baseball player
Tom Miller (American football) (1918–2005), who was inducted into the Green Bay Packers Hall of Fame
Tom Miller (Australian footballer) (born 1928), Australian rules footballer
Tom Miller (politician) (born 1944), state Attorney General of Iowa
Tom Miller (ice hockey) (1947–2017), Kitchener Ranger who played in the NHL
Tom Miller (travel writer) (born 1947), travel writer from Tucson
Tom Miller (basketball) (born 1948), former college basketball coach
Tom Miller (computer programmer) (born 1950), Microsoft employee
Tom Miller (performance artist) (born 1965), American writer and performance artist
Tom Miller (musician) (born 1976), American musician and co-creator of Black Camaro
Tom Miller (footballer, born 1990), English professional footballer
Tom Miller (1890s footballer), English professional footballer
Tom Miller (artist) (1945–2000), American artist

See also
Tom Miller a character from Heroes (TV series)
Thomas Miller (disambiguation)
Tommy Miller (born 1979), English footballer
Robert Thomas Miller (died 1962), mayor of Austin, Texas